Sergente Giovanni Nicelli was an Italian World War I flying ace. He was credited with eight or nine confirmed aerial victories (sources vary), and died in service to his nation on 5 May 1918.

Early life
Nicelli was born on 27 October 1893 in Lugagnano Val d'Arda, Province of Piacenza, the Kingdom of Italy.

World War I
First records available of Nicelli show him as a Caporale, piloting a Nieuport 17 for 79a Squadriglia in April 1917. His first aerial victory claim was reported for 14 June 1917. He would post 11 more claims before his death.

As 79a Squadriglia was drawn into the Battle of Caporetto towards the end of 1917, Nicelli forced down two Austro-Hungarian airplanes and won his first Silver award of the Medal for Military Valor. On 30 January 1918, he claimed his sixth victory and was once again awarded the Silver Medal for Military Valor. He continued his successes until 4 May 1918, when he tackled seven enemy aircraft singlehandedly, and was credited with downing one of them. He was also credited with a second victory that day, in a separate action. The following day, 5 May 1918, Giovanni Nicelli's Nieuport 27 broke up while in flight, killing him.

List of aerial victories
See also Aerial victory standards of World War I

Confirmed victories are numbered and listed chronologically. Unconfirmed victories are denoted by "u/c" and may or may not be listed by date.

The victory claims of Italian aces were scrutinized postwar by a commission from Italy's Military Intelligence branch. They disallowed Nicelli's first victory, crediting him with eight confirmed victories. Aviation historians credit him with nine.

Endnotes

References
 Franks, Norman; Guest, Russell; Alegi, Gregory.  Above the War Fronts: The British Two-seater Bomber Pilot and Observer Aces, the British Two-seater Fighter Observer Aces, and the Belgian, Italian, Austro-Hungarian and Russian Fighter Aces, 1914–1918: Volume 4 of Fighting Airmen of WWI Series: Volume 4 of Air Aces of WWI. Grub Street, 1997. , .

1893 births
1918 deaths
Aviators killed in aviation accidents or incidents in Italy
Italian World War I flying aces
Recipients of the Silver Medal of Military Valor
Victims of aviation accidents or incidents in 1918
Italian military personnel killed in World War I